This is a list of Wadham College, Oxford people, including alumni, Fellows, Deans and Wardens of the College. An alphabetical list of alumni of Wadham college can be found here.

Alumni

Academics

 Martin Aitken, archaeometrist
 Amir Attaran, epidemiologist
 Charles Badham, classics scholar
 Owen Barfield, philosopher, author, poet, and critic
 William Bayliss, physiologist
 Edward Spencer Beesly, historian and positivist
 Henry de Beltgens Gibbins, economic historian
 Richard Bentley, scholar and critic
 James Theodore Bent, explorer and archaeologist
 Bernard Bergonzi, literary scholar
 George Fielding Blandford, psychiatrist
 Nathan Bodington, first Vice-Chancellor of the University of Leeds
 Dietrich von Bothmer, art historian
 Harvie Branscomb, Chancellor of Vanderbilt University
 William Brown, Master of Darwin College, Cambridge
 Alan Bullock, historian of Nazi Germany
 Colin Campbell, geologist
 Allan Chapman, historian of science
 Oliver Carmichael, 3rd Chancellor of Vanderbilt University and 20th President of the University of Alabama
 Anthony Cheetham, materials scientist
 Robert Caesar Childers, Pali language scholar
 Pamela Clemit, literary critic
 Richard Congreve, philosopher and positivist
 Steven Connor, literary scholar
 Athelstan John Cornish-Bowden, biochemist
 Sedley Cudmore, economist and Chief Statistician of Canada
 Peter Day, inorganic chemist
 Emma Dench, classicist
 Frederick Augustus Dixey, entomologist 
 Barrie Dobson, historian
 Nakdimon S. Doniach, lexicographer and linguist
 Edward Gordon Duff, bibliographer and librarian
 William Rickatson Dykes, botanist
 Marcus du Sautoy, mathematician
 Peter Edwards, historian
 Henry Emeleus, petrologist
 John Eveleigh, Provost of Oriel College, Oxford
 George Stanley Farnell, classist
 Roderick Floud, economic historian
 E.B. Ford, ecological geneticist 
 Sandra Fredman, Professor of Law
 David B. Frohnmayer, President of the University of Oregon and politician
 Philip A. Gale, chemist
 Ian Grant, physicist
 Harry George Grey, theologian and Principal of Wycliffe Hall, Oxford
 Thomas Guidott, physician
 Jeffrey Hackney, legal scholar
 Edith Hall, classics scholar
 Avraham Harman, diplomat and President of the Hebrew University of Jerusalem
 James Harris, legal scholar, Professor of the London School of Economics and Fellow of the British Academy
 James Harris, grammarian
 Robert Hooke, architect, natural philosopher, scientist, polymath, co-founder of the Royal Society
 Sir Thomas Graham Jackson, architect
 Ian Grant, physicist
 Ivor Grattan-Guinness, historian of mathematics
 Jennifer Ingleheart, classicist
 Gilbert Ironside the younger, Bishop of Hereford and Warden of Wadham
 James Jago, physician
 Frank Jevons, Vice-Chancellor of Durham University
 Benjamin Kennicott, Hebrew scholar
 Richard S. Lambert, biographer and broadcaster
 John Leslie, philosopher
 David MacDonald, biologist and conservationist 
 Ruth Mace, evolutionary anthropologist
 Sally Mapstone, Principal of the University of St Andrews
 P. J. Marshall, historian of the British empire in the 18th century
 John Mayow, chemist, physician, and physiologist
 Alister McGrath, Christian apologist and theologian
 Frank McLynn, historian and biographer
 Nevil Story Maskelyne, geologist and politician
 Leslie Mitchell, historian
 Charles Morton, educator
 Peter Nailor, civil servant, intellectual and professor 
 William Neile, mathematician
 Farhan Nizami, scholar in Islamic studies
 Tony Orchard, inorganic chemist
 John Parsons, Master of Balliol College, Oxford and Bishop of Peterborough
 William Plenderleath, antiquarian
 Josephine Crawley Quinn, ancient historian and archaeologist
 P. J. Rhodes, ancient historian
 Stuart J. Russell, computer scientist
 Phillipp Schofield, historian
 Henry Albert Schultens, linguist
 Walter Shirley, priest and historian
 Tom Solomon, neurologist
 Thomas Sprat, divine and co-founder of the Royal Society
 Benjamin Parsons Symons, Warden of Wadham
 Richard W. Tsien, electric engineer and neurobiologist
 Wilson Dallam Wallis, anthropologist
 Ethelbert Dudley Warfield, historian and academic administrator
 Rex Warner, classicist, writer and translator
 William Whyte, historian 
 Donald Wiseman, biblical scholar and Assyriologist
 Sir Christopher Wren, architect and co-founder of the Royal Society

Authors, artists, broadcasters and entertainers

 Diran Adebayo, novelist
 Monica Ali, novelist
 Hossein Amini, film director and screenplay writer
 Lindsay Anderson, film director
 Timothy Bateson, actor
 Sir Thomas Beecham, conductor
 Melvyn Bragg, television broadcaster and writer
 Simon Brett, writer
Jess Cartner-Morley, fashion editor of The Guardian newspaper
 Andy Cato, of Groove Armada
 Alan Connor, journalist and television presenter
 David Constantine, poet and translator
 Alan Coren, comic writer
 Robert Crampton, Times journalist
 Cecil Day-Lewis, former Poet Laureate
 Sophie Duker, stand-up comedian and writer
 James Flint, writer
 Isabel Fonseca, writer
 Neil Forrester, artist and cast member of The Real World TV show (London series)
 Tim Franks, journalist
 Jonathan Freedland, journalist
 Peter Gammond, music critic
 Amelia Gentleman, journalist
 Nordahl Grieg, Norwegian poet and playwright
 John Gross, author and literary critic
 Tom Gross, journalist and political commentator
 Francis Wrigley Hirst, journalist
 Montague Haltrecht, writer and literary critic
 Tom Holt, author of humorous and military fantasies, and of historical fiction
 Felicity Jones, actress
 Reginald Victor Jones, physicist, scientific military intelligence expert and writer
 Michael Kenyon, novelist
 Hari Kunzru, novelist
 Tim McInnerny, actor and comedian
 Patrick Marber, comedian and playwright
 Sharon Mascall, journalist, broadcaster and writer
 Jodhi May, actress
 Anne McElvoy, journalist and broadcaster
 Robert McGill, writer and literary critic
 Hilary Menos, poet
 Roger Mosey, BBC executive, Director of London 2012 Olympic Games coverage
 Neil Nightingale, director the BBC Natural History Unit from 2003 to 2009
 David Patrikarakos, author and journalist
 Iain Pears, novelist
 Laurie Penny, author and social activist
 Rosamund Pike, actress
 William Rayner, novelist
 Tony Richardson, English theatre and Academy Award-winning film director and producer
 Stevan Riley, film director
 Jude Rogers, judge
 Michael Rosen, poet and broadcaster
 Joshua Rozenberg, legal commentator and journalist
 Carr Scrope, versifier
 Peter Sculthorpe, composer
 Sir Charles Sedley, 5th Baronet, wit, dramatist and politician
 Fatemeh Shams, Award-winning poet and professor of Persian literature at University of Pennsylvania
 Mary Ann Sieghart, former assistant editor of The Times
 Leonard Strong, novelist, critic, historian and poet
 Paul Vaughan, journalist
 William Walsh, poet and critic
 Irving Wardle, theatre critic
 John Wilmot, 2nd Earl of Rochester, libertine poet and protégé of King Charles II
 Humbert Wolfe, poet

Clergy

 Peter Allan, monk and Principal of College of the Resurrection
 Francis Bampfield, non-conformist minister
 Samuel Barnett, social reformer and Canon of Westminster Abbey
 Adrian Benjamin, clergyman and former actor
 Edward Bidwell, Bishop of Ontario
 Henry Bowlby, Bishop of Coventry
 Cornelius Burges, minister
 Richard William Church, churchman and writer
 John Erskine Clarke, clergyman
 Thomas Crofts, clergyman
 Cecil de Carteret, Bishop of Jamaica
 Robert Deakin, clergyman
 Joseph Diggle, clergyman, politician and public servant
 Edward Eddrup, clergyman and principal of Salisbury Theological College
 Edward Feild, clergyman
 Giles Fraser, Canon Chancellor of St Paul's Cathedral
 Campbell Hone,  Bishop of Wakefield
 Walsham How, clergyman and botanist
 William Henry Jackson, priest, missionary and inventor of Burmese Braille
 Francis Jayne, clergyman
 Hewlett Johnson, clergyman, "Red Dean of Canterbury"
 Francis Kilvert, clergyman and diarist
 Alexander Mackonochie, mission priest
 Thomas Manton, clergyman
 Edward Garrard Marsh, poet and clergyman
 John Medley, first Bishop of Fredericton
 Wilfrid Oldaker, schoolmaster and Precentor of Christ Church, Oxford 
 Reginald Owen, Primate of New Zealand
 Samuel Parker, clergyman
 Charles Ranken, clergyman and chess master
 William Jenkins Rees, clergyman and antiquary
  William Skinner, bishop of Aberdeen
 Edward Stone, clergyman and natural philosopher
 Rowan Williams, former Archbishop of Canterbury
 Richard Willis, Bishop
 Richard Woodward, Bishop Cloyne
 Foster Barham Zincke, clergyman, traveller, and antiquary

Politicians and civil servants

 Tom Allen, US Representative from Maine
 William Shepherd Allen, UK and New Zealand politician
 Michael Alison, politician
 Anita Anand, Canadian politician and Minister of Public Services and Procurement
  Edward Ashe, English politician and Father of the House
 Michael Bates, Baron Bates, politician
 Thomas Baring, politician
 Richard Barnett, politician
 Richard Bethell, 1st Baron Westbury, former Lord Chancellor
 Marco Biagi, Scottish National Party politician
 Robert Blake, Cromwell's admiral
 David Blatherwick, diplomat
 John Bluett, politician
 John Bramston the Younger, politician
 Norman Brook, 1st Baron Normanbrook, civil servant, Cabinet Secretary 1947-1962
 William Burge, Attorney General of Jamaica and anti-abolitionist 
 Edward Cakobau, Deputy Prime Minister of Fiji
 Hugh Childers, statesman
 Charles Delacourt-Smith, Baron Delacourt-Smith, politician
 H. R. P. Dickson, colonial political officer and author
 Joseph Diggle, clergyman and politician
 John Dyson, Lord Dyson, judge and Master of the Rolls
 Derek Enright, politician
 Vincent Evans, Judge on the European Court of Human Rights
 Charles Fane, 1st Viscount Fane, politician
 Steven Fisher, diplomat
 Bernard Floud, politician
 Peter Floud, civil servant
 Michael Foot, politician
 William Fox, premier of New Zealand
 Sydney Giffard, diplomat
 Penaia Ganilau, former Governor General and President of Fiji
 Eileen E. Gillese, judge
 Neil Gerrard, politician
 Tuanku Abdul Halim, Sultan of Kedah, The King of Malaysia (1970–1975 and 2011-2017)
 Robert Hannigan, cryptographer and civil servant
 John Hanson, diplomat
 Joseph Hardcastle, politician
 John Hardres, politician
 Avraham Harman, Israeli diplomat
 Evan Harris, former Liberal Democrat MP for Oxford West and Abingdon
 George Harrison, politician
 Charles Hodson, Baron Hodson, judge
 Marc Holland, Administrator of Ascension Island
 Sir Edmund Isham, 6th Baronet, politician
 Wyndham Knatchbull-Wyndham, politician
 Thomas Lewis, politician
 Richard Lloyd, royalist
 Mark Logan, MP for Bolton North East
 John Lovelace, 3rd Baron Lovelace, Whig politician
 Eric Macfadyen, politician 
 Kenneth Maddocks, former Governor and Commander-in-Chief of Fiji
 Kamisese Mara, former Prime Minister and President of Fiji
 Duncan Menzies, Lord Menzies, judge of the Supreme Courts of Scotland
 Peter Milliken,  Speaker of the House of Commons of Canada
 T. E. Moir, civil servant
 James Morris, Conservative MP for Halesowen and Rowley Regis
 Robert Moses, city planner
 James Munby, judge
 James Murray, politician
 Michael Nolan, Baron Nolan, judge, first chairman of the Committee on Standards in Public Life (1994–1997), Chancellor of the University of Essex (1997–2002)
 Feroz Khan Noon, Prime Minister of Pakistan
 Arthur Onslow, former Speaker of the House of Commons
 William Palmes, politician
 Gopalaswami Parthasarathy, Indian diplomat and journalist
 Edward Phelips, politician
 Carew Raleigh, politician
 Emma Reynolds, MP for Wolverhampton North East
 Colin Thornton-Kemsley, National Liberal politician 
 Sir Thomas Rich, 1st Baronet, politician
 Denys Roberts, Chief Justice of the Supreme Court of Hong Kong
 Alexander Roche, Baron Roche, law lord
 Sir William Russell, 1st Baronet, of Wytley, politician
 Philip Rycroft, civil servant 
 Wasim Sajjad, two time interim President of Pakistan and former Chairman Senate
 John C. Sherburne, Vermont politician
 John Simon, 1st Viscount Simon, former Lord Chancellor
 F. E. Smith, 1st Earl of Birkenhead, former Lord Chancellor
 Simon Smith, diplomat
  Thomas Strangways, Father of the House
 Lala Sukuna, Fijian chief
 Randolph Vigne, South African anti-apartheid activist
 K. N. Wanchoo, Chief Justice of India
 Eugene Wason, Scottish politician
 Geoffrey Whiskard, diplomat
 Daryl Williams, Attorney-General for Australia
 Henry Penruddocke Wyndham, politician, topographer and author
 Hugh Wyndham, judge
 Thomas Wyndham (of Witham Friary), politician
 Thomas Wyndham, 1st Baron Wyndham, Irish lawyer and politician, former Lord Chancellor of Ireland
 Sir Wadham Wyndham, judge
 Sir Peter William Youens, former Deputy Chief Secretary of Nyasaland (today Malawi) and secretary to the Prime Minister and the Cabinet of Malawi

Other

 Noel Agazarian, World War II fighter ace
 Simon Anholt, political scientist, policy advisor
 E. W. Bastard, cricketer
 Arthur Berry, footballer
 Alan Blackshaw, mountaineer, skier and civil servant
 William Bromet, rugby player
 Brian Burnett, Royal Air Force and Commander-in-Chief of British Far East Command
 Sir Michael Checkland, former Director General of the BBC
 John Cooke, prosecutor of Charles I
 Warren East, businessman, Chief executive of ARM Holdings plc
 William Freke, mystic
 C. B. Fry, sportsman
 George Hogg, adventurer
 George Hastings, 8th Earl of Huntingdon, nobleman
 Richard Koch, management consultant
 David Levin, entrepreneur
 Emily Ludolf, amateur chef, finalist on BBC 2's Masterchef, 2008
 John MacBain, businessman
 Paul McMahon, cricketer
 Algernon Methuen, publisher
 Herbert Page, cricketeer
 Nathaniel Philip Rothschild, British financier and only son of Jacob Rothschild, 4th Baron Rothschild
 Edward Saatchi, entrepreneur
 Chris Saunders, cricketer and headmaster
 Steven Skala, banker
 Dr Richard Stone OBE, social campaigner, philanthropist, anti-racism and interfaith activist

Fellows and honorary Fellows

 Alfred Ayer, logical positivist
 Michael R. Ayers, philosopher
 John Bamborough, scholar of English literature and founding Principal of Linacre College, Oxford
 John Bell, Professor of Law and Fellow of Pembroke College, Cambridge
 T.J. Binyon, Russian literature scholar and crime writer
 Ian Brownlie, barrister and academic in international law
 Philip Bullock, Professor of Russian Literature and Music
 Peter Carter, legal scholar
 Allan Chapman, historian of science
 Richard Congreve, philosopher
 Charles Coulson, applied mathematician, theoretical chemist and religious author
 Peter Derow, historian of ancient Greece and Rome
 Frederick Augustus Dixey, former President of the Royal Entomological Society of London
 Terry Eagleton, Marxist literary theorist
 Eprime Eshag, Keynesian economist
 Jeffrey Hackney, legal scholar
 Andrew Hodges, mathematician, author and Dean of Wadham College
 Humphrey Hody, clergyman and theologian
 Thomas Graham Jackson, architect
 Frederick Lindemann, 1st Viscount Cherwell, Churchill's scientific adviser during the Second World War
 Nicholas Lloyd, cleric and lexicographer
 David Mabberley, botanist, educator and writer
 Edward Arthur Milne, astrophysicist and mathematician
 Ted Nelson, American sociologist, philosopher, and pioneer of information technology
 Bernard O'Donoghue, Irish poet
 Roger Penrose, mathematical physicist and philosopher
 Benjamin Bickley Rogers, classical scholar
 Richard Sharpe, historian of medieval England, Ireland, Scotland and Wales
 Marcus du Sautoy, mathematician, writer, television presenter
 Edward Stone, Rector who discovered the active ingredient of Aspirin
 John Swinton, writer, academic, Church of England clergyman and orientalist
 Joseph Trapp, clergyman, academic, poet and pamphleteer
 Theodore Wade-Gery, classical scholar, historian and epigrapher
 Joseph White, orientalist and theologian
 John Williams, Welsh lawyer and writer
 R. J. P. (Bob) Williams, inorganic chemist
 Robert J.C. Young, post-colonial theorist, cultural critic, and historian

Honorary Fellows

 Abdul Halim of Kedah, Sultan of Kedah
 Sir Franklin Berman, barrister, judge and arbitrator
 Melvyn Bragg, Baron Bragg, television broadcaster
 Sir Brian Burnett, Air Chief Marshal 
 Sir Neil Chalmers, zoologist and former Warden of Wadham
 Sir Michael Checkland, former Director General of the BBC
 Peter Day, inorganic chemist
 John Dyson, Lord Dyson, Master of the Rolls 
 Sir Roderick Floud, economic historian
 Sandra Fredman, academic lawyer
 Sir Sydney Giffard, diplomat and author
 Allan Gotlieb, Canadian public servant and author
 Robert Hannigan, former director of GCHQ
 Allen Hill, bioinorganic chemist
 Jeremy R. Knowles, former professor of chemistry at Harvard University
 Lee Shau-kee, businessman
 David Malcolm, lawyer
 Sally Mapstone, principal of the University of St Andrews
 P. J. Marshall, historian of the British Empire
 Nevil Story Maskelyne, geologist and politician
 Peter Milliken, lawyer and politician
 Claus Moser, Baron Moser, statistician and public servant
 Sir James Munby, judge
 Michael Nolan, Baron Nolan, judge, first chairman of the Committee on Standards in Public Life (1994–1997), Chancellor of the University of Essex (1997–2002)
 Ashraf Pahlavi, Princess of Iran
 Sir Denys Roberts, former British colonial official and judge
 Sir Christopher Rose, former judge
 Wasim Sajjad, Pakistani lawyer and legal educator
 Sir David Smith, botanist
 Kathleen Sullivan, lawyer
 Rowan Williams, former Archbishop of Canterbury
 Robert J. C. Young, philosopher and historian

Wardens
The Warden is the college's principal, responsible for its academic leadership, chairing its governing body, and representing it in the outside world. Below is a list of the Wardens of Wadham college in chronological order. Their time in office is given in parentheses.

 Robert Wright (20 April-20 July 1613), Bishop of Bristol and Bishop of Lichfield
 John Fleming (1613–1617)
 William Smyth (1617–1635)
 Daniel Estcot (1635–1644)
 John Pitt (1644–1648)
 John Wilkins (1648–1659), Bishop, scholar and co-founder of the Royal Society
 Walter Blandford (1659–1665), Bishop of Oxford, 1665, Bishop of Worcester, 1671
 Gilbert Ironside the younger (1665–1689), Bishop of Bristol, 1689, Bishop of Hereford, 1691
 Thomas Dunster (1689–1719)
 William Baker (1719–1724), Bishop of Bangor, 1724, Bishop of Norwich, 1727
 Robert Thistlethwayte (1724–1739), clergyman, fled to France in 1737 after a homosexual scandal
 Samuel Lisle (1739–1744), Bishop of St. Asaph, 1744, Bishop of Norwich, 1748
 George Wyndham (1744–1777)
 James Gerard (1777–1783)
 John Wills (1783–1806), administrator, Vice-Chancellor of Oxford University (1792–1796)
 William Tournay (1806–1831)
 Benjamin Parsons Symons (1831–1871), Vice-Chancellor of Oxford University (1844–1848)
 John Griffiths (1871–1881), Keeper of the Archives (1857–1885)
 George E. Thorley (1881–1903)
 Patrick A. Wright-Henderson (1903–1913)
 Joseph Wells (1913–1927), Vice-Chancellor of Oxford University (1923–1926)
 John F. Stenning (1927–1938)
 Maurice Bowra (1938–1970), classical scholar and academic, known for his wit
 Stuart Hampshire (1970–1984), philosopher and literary critic
 Claus Moser, Baron Moser (1984–1993), statistician and civil servant
 John Flemming (1993–2004), economist, Pro-Vice-Chancellor of Oxford University, Fellow of the British Academy
 Neil Chalmers (2004–2012), former Director of the Natural History Museum
 Ken Macdonald, Baron Macdonald of River Glaven (2012–2021), former Director of Public Prosecutions of England and Wales (2003–2008)
 Robert Hannigan (2021–present)

Deans
Responsible for various aspects of the day-to-day student life of the College, the Dean has authority in matters of discipline concerning the behaviour of individuals or groups.  Below is a list of the Deans of Wadham college in chronological order, together with their time in office.

 John Pitt 1613, 1616–17
 John Goodridge 1613, 1618
 Matthew Osborne 1614, 1619
 Daniel Estcot 1615, Warden 1635–1644
 Ralph Flexney 1620
 Alexander Huish 1621
 Ignatius Jordan 1622
 Amias Hext 1622–23
 William Boswell 1624, 1626
 Francis Strode 1625
 Gilbert Drake 1627–28
 William Turner 1629–31
 John Warren 1632–33
 Tristram Sugge 1635, 1636
 Leonard Simons 1637, 1644–1645, 1647
 Robert Chapline 1638–39
 Richard Goodridge 1641
 George Ashwell 1642–43
 Richard Knightbridge 1646, resigned 1647 and replaced by Leonard Simons
 Anthony Nourse 1647
 Samuel Lee 1653
 John Ball 1659, died 1660 and replaced by William Turges
 Walter Pope 1660
 Daniel Estcott 1661
 Thomas Jeamson 1662, 1667
 John Chase 1663, 1671
 Brian Cave 1665, 1668
 Nathaniel Salter 1669
 William Thornton 1670
 George Fletcher 1672, 1676, died 1676 and replaced by William Shortgrave
 John Ludwell 1673–1674
 Thomas Lessey 1675
 Robert Pitt 1677
 Robert Balch 1678
 William Latton 1679
 William Gould 1681
 George Harding 1683, replaced by Thomas Lyndesay
 Thomas Pigott 1684
 Alexander Crooke 1685
 Thomas Lidgould 1686
 Thomas Dunster 1687
 Humphrey Hody 1688
 Robert Doyley 1689
 William Hunt 1719
 John Leaves 1720, 1725, 1727
 Robert Nash 1721
 George Bowditch 1722, 1726
 Philip Speke 1723–24
 Edwyn Sandys 1728
 Stopford Jacks c.1925
 John Frederick Stenning, Warden 1927–1938
 Maurice Bowra c.1922–1938, Warden 1938–70
 A.J. Ayer 1945, philosopher
 John Bamborough 1947–54, founding Principal of Linacre College, Oxford
 T.J. Binyon ?–1976 & 1980s, literary scholar and writer
 David Mabberley 1976–82 and 1991–96, botanist and writer
 James Morwood 2000–2006, Grocyn Lecturer in Classics
 Andrew Hodges 2011–2014, mathematician and writer
 Martin Bureau, 2014–2016, Lindemann Fellow and Tutor in Physics, astrophysicist
 Claudia Pazos Alonso, 2016–2019, Fellow and Tutor in Portuguese
 Andrew D Farmery 2019–2022, Sir Samuel Scott of Yews Fellow and Tutor in Medicine; Professor of Anaesthetics
 Sarah J. Cullinan Herring 2022-present, Hody Fellow and Tutor in Classics.

References

 
 

Wadham
People associated with Wadham College, Oxford